Mahusk (also Romanized as Māhūsk; also known as Mahūsk Pā’īn) is a village in Alqurat Rural District, in the Central District of Birjand County, South Khorasan Province, Iran. At the 2006 census, its population was 97, in 44 families.

References 

Populated places in Birjand County